White Front was a chain of discount department stores in California and the western United States from 1959 through the mid-1970s. The stores were noted for the architecture of their store fronts which was an enormous, sweeping archway with the store name spelled in individual letters fanned across the top.

History 
The name White Front was said to refer to the practice of lining up appliances (so-called "white goods") like washers, dryers and stoves in front of the store, giving it a "white front." Another feature of each store was that each had a separate key booth located in the parking lot.

In 1929, the company was founded and opened its first store at 7651 S. Central Avenue in Florence, South Los Angeles In 1950 it expanded this store. In a 1950 advertisement, the company tongue-in-cheek explained that its lone location was in a "low rent area".

Its second store opened in October 1957 at 16040 Sherman Way in Van Nuys. In April 1959, the two stores were acquired by Interstate Department Stores, Inc., for $1,650,000 in cash and shares. Interstate expanded the chain to other California locations and broadened its retail mix beyond the original housewares. In September 1960, Interstate also acquired Connecticut-based Topps Discount Stores, which at the time had 10 stores in the Eastern United States, but always kept Topps as a separate business entity. For several years, White Front was the leading discount store in the U.S.

Entering the Portland market 

In 1970, the company made an attempt to expand into Oregon market at the Mall 205 in Portland, Oregon. The store had its grand opening on September 19, 1970.  The grand opening ceremony featured Allen Ludden of Password fame (most store openings were promoted by Hollywood stars). The Portland store failed largely due to competition from other retailers.  Plans were made to construct additional stores in Beaverton and Milwaukie but they never materialized.

Entering the Puget Sound market 
White Front entered the Seattle/Tacoma market on October 19, 1967, with the North Seattle location in a 155,000-square-foot building and a parking lot with a capacity for 1,000 vehicles. The grand opening was hosted by the stars of Petticoat Junction, Howard Duff, and Sharon Vaughn, the former Miss Washington of 1958, who was known as Miss White Front for the opening. It was televised live for three hours on KING-TV. Four additional stores were built in high-traffic areas in Burien, Tacoma, Bellevue, and Everett.

All but the Everett location were closed by January 19, 1973. The last ad for White Front appeared in The Seattle Times on December 9, 1972. The Everett and Portland stores remained open (the only two locations to remain open outside of California) while the remaining stores' merchandise was liquidated until February 1973. According to a December 14 article in The Seattle Times, the company stated that "the five stores hadn't begun to turn a profit".  While the company was quiet about the closures, local factors including the "Boeing Bust", could have played a role in the downturn of the chain in the area.  Archives about the company don’t  indicate a local distribution center in the Northwest.

In an article published by The Seattle Times (on June 16, 1972) General Manager Walter Craig, explained that the stores had yet to make a profit in the Northwest but wanted to retool the stores for the customer base by adding more lights, widening aisles for better traffic flow, repainting the exterior of the building, and restriping the parking lots spending $250,000. The company implemented a "Friedlee" program complete with an elf like mascot to improve customer service.

Three of the four closed stores were acquired by Weisfields to become Valu-Mart/Leslie's stores by the end of 1973.  The grocery sections were leased to Associated Grocers. The Tacoma store had seen many ownership changes: first as a Valu-Mart/Leslie's store (acquired in February 1973), later a Jafco and then a Best store (currently Michael's). The Burien store became the flagship store for Valu-Mart/Leslie's (currently Fred Meyer). It was acquired from White Front in February 1973.  The Burien location is one of the larger stores in the Fred Meyer chain. The North Seattle store became a Kmart (closed in January 2013). The Everett store (appears to have remained opened until the company's complete liquidation in 1974 according to Everett Mall leasing records) was integrated into Everett Mall in 1977 to become a Bon Marché and then Macy's (Macy's recently closed the store). The Bellevue store was acquired by Valu-Mart/Leslie's in November 1973 and became a Fred Meyer as well. The towering store signs used for the locations remain visible at the North Seattle and Tacoma sites.

Stores built before 1970 contained a "Discount Foods" grocery store department.  Safeway Inc. took ownership of the grocery section in some markets, and newer-design stores, such as those in Everett and Bellevue that were built without the arch, also did not have a grocery store.

Bankruptcy 
In 1966, Interstate acquired the toy store chain Children's Supermart, predecessor of Toys "R" Us. White Front was closed after Interstate filed for bankruptcy in 1974. Some of the locations were changed to Two Guys, another discount chain. Two Guys soon failed as well, and the stores became relabeled as FedMart stores, which eventually were purchased by Target. The Target store in San Bernardino, California sported the archway across its facade for many years until a recent remodeling.

The White Front store on California Avenue in Bakersfield, California, was taken over by Zody's. Later it was purchased and remodeled by Mervyn’s, which soon went out of business.

A number of independent local pharmacies continue to carry the White Front name in Costa Mesa and elsewhere, having inherited it from their former host stores, but are otherwise unrelated.

See also
 List of defunct department stores of the United States

References

External links
 White Front building at 2222 Harbor Blvd, Anaheim California — a very early White Front store.
 White Front building at Everett Mall, Everett, Washington — after remodeling into a Bon Marche store, retaining modern 1970 White Front facade (without the arch).

Defunct discount stores of the United States
Defunct companies based in Greater Los Angeles
1929 establishments in California
1985 disestablishments in California
Retail companies established in 1929
Retail companies disestablished in 1985